Dale Dubin, M.D. (b. 1940), is a former American plastic surgeon and author of several cardiology textbooks.

Dubin practiced medicine in Tampa, Florida, and gained fame within the medical community with the 1972 publication of Rapid Interpretation of EKG's, a best-selling textbook suited for medical students and junior residents. In it, Dubin adopts a simplistic fill-in-the-blank style to teach the basics of reading electrocardiograms. In the fiftieth printing of the book, he hid within the copyright notice an offer to give his prized 1965 Ford Thunderbird to anyone who actually read the message and responded. Out of 60,000 copies in that printing, only 5 readers noticed and responded, and Dubin's own daughter delivered the car to the winner (selected by a random drawing). Dubin also wrote Adventure in the Heartland: Exploring the Heart's Ionic-Molecular Microcosm and Understanding Cardio-pulmonary Resuscitation.

In 1986, Dubin, age 46, was arrested and pled guilty to charges related to child pornography and cocaine. He was sentenced to 5 years in prison and his Florida medical license was revoked.

References

External links
 Dale Dubin: Pornography and Prison – Scrub Notes: A Blog For Med Students, 9/21/2007.

American surgeons
People from Tampa, Florida